Events in the year 2021 in Malta.

Incumbents
 President: George Vella
 Prime Minister: Robert Abela

Events
Ongoing — COVID-19 pandemic in Malta

Year

February 

 Death: Cynthia Turner, pianist (born 1932).

October 

 Maltese 2021 Budget

References

 
2020s in Malta
Years of the 21st century in Malta
Malta
Malta